Relight My Fire is the fourth full-length album from singer-songwriter Dan Hartman.

Released in 1979, the title track, "Relight My Fire", became a hit single.

Track listing

Personnel
Dan Hartman - vocals, guitar, bass, keyboards, percussion, backing vocals
G.E. Smith, Phil Houghton - guitar
Hilly Michaels, Brian Brake - drums
Jimmy Maelen, Larry Washington - congas, timbales
Craig Peyton - vibraphone
Blanche Napoleon - backing vocals
Michael Barbiero - additional percussion
Loleatta Holloway - lead vocals on "Vertigo/Relight My Fire"
Edgar Winter - alto saxophone on "Hands Down"
Stevie Wonder - harmonica on "Hands Down"

Legacy
The album inspired Miquel Brown's single "So Many Men — So Little Time". According to Ian Levine (who cowrote the song with Fiachra Trench):The big record at [the London LGBT nightclub] Heaven was Dan Hartman's 'Relight My Fire'—that's when we brought the big fans out and two thousand people had their hands in the air screaming. It was electrifying. But there weren't enough records coming out that could capture that magic, so we started making our own. I had been at the Circus Maximus in L.A. and I saw a guy wearing a T-shirt that said, 'So many men, so little time,' and I was like, 'One day I want to make a record with that title.' The concept was I sat down with my cowriter and arranger, an Irish guy called Fiachra Trench, and I played him 'Relight My Fire' and I said, 'I want this kind of choppy piano, big powerful chords, and the idea is a woman is going to sing, instead of “I love you, I want you, you're the man of my dreams,” I want the opposite. I want “I wake up next to this man and say, 'Who are you?'” It's so naughty but nice and everyone'll love it.'

References

1979 albums
Dan Hartman albums
Albums produced by Dan Hartman
Blue Sky Records albums
Epic Records albums